Big Electric Chair, created in 1967, is part of a series of works by Andy Warhol depicting an electric chair. Death by electrocution was a controversial subject in New York City, where the artist lived and worked, especially after the last two executions at Sing Sing Correctional Facility in 1963. The empty chair is believed to be a metaphor for death. Warhol obtained a photograph of the empty execution chamber, which became the basis for this series.

References

1967 paintings
American art
Paintings by Andy Warhol